Route 393 is a Quebec provincial highway located in the province's Abitibi-Témiscamingue and Nord-du-Québec regions. The highway runs from the junction of Route 101 in the Rouyn-Noranda suburb of Destor and ends in Val-Paradis in the municipality of Baie-James. In La Sarre it overlaps Route 111.

Municipalities along Route 393

 Rouyn-Noranda
 Duparquet
 Rapide-Danseur
 Palmarolle
 Sainte-Hélène-de-Mancebourg
 La Sarre
 Clermont (Val-Saint-Gilles) 
 Baie-James (Beaucanton / Val-Paradis)

See also
 List of Quebec provincial highways

References

External links 
 Official Transports Quebec Map 
 Route 393 on Google Maps

393
Transport in Rouyn-Noranda